Edward Pope may refer to:

Eddie Pope (born 1973), American soccer player
Edward Pope (priest) (died 1671), Archdeacon of Gloucester
Edward Brian Pope (1911–2011), English rugby player